Mary Beth Rondeau (born 19 December 1956) is a Canadian former freestyle swimmer. She competed in five events at the 1972 Summer Olympics.

References

External links
 

1956 births
Living people
Canadian female freestyle swimmers
Olympic swimmers of Canada
Swimmers at the 1972 Summer Olympics
Swimmers from Vancouver